This is a list of Iranian provincial General-governors

External links
List of provincial governors on official website of Iranian Ministry of Interior (In Persian), updated with newer information

 
Provincial governors under President Khatami